Medvenka is an urban locality (an urban-type settlement) in Medvensky District of Kursk Oblast, Russia. Population:

Geography 
The settlement is located on the Medvenka (a.k.a. Medvensky Kolodez) Brook (a left tributary of the Polnaya in the basin of the Seym), 65 km from the Russia–Ukraine border, 33 km south of Kursk.

 Streets
There are the following streets in the locality: 1st Maya, Beryozovaya, Cheptsova, pereulok F. Engelsa, Gagarina, pereulok Gazovy, Ivana Kozheduba, K. Marksa, Kirova, Kolkhoznaya, Komsomolskaya, pereulok Kooperativny, pereulok Kutuzova, pereulok Lenina, Lenina, M. Gorkogo, Magistralnaya, Marata, Molodyozhnaya, pereulok Nakhimova, Parkovaya, Pevneva, Ploshchad Geroyev, Polevaya, 2nd Polevaya, Pochtovaya, Proletarskaya, Promyshlennaya, 2nd Promyshlennaya, pereulok Promyshlenny, Raduzhnaya, Sadovaya, pereulok Shkolny, Sovetskaya, Sovkhoznaya, Solnechnaya, pereulok Suvorova, Uspenskaya, pereulok Vatutina, Konstantina Vorobyova, Yuzhnaya, pereulok Zavodskoy and Zelyonaya (1464 houses).

 Climate
Medvenka has a warm-summer humid continental climate (Dfb in the Köppen climate classification).

Transport 

The locality is situated 39.5 km from Kursk Vostochny Airport, 91 km from Belgorod International Airport and 220 km from Voronezh Peter the Great Airport.

References

Urban-type settlements in Kursk Oblast
Oboyansky Uyezd